The Tolsey Museum is a local museum in the town of Burford, west Oxfordshire, England. It is located a Tudor style structure, known as The Tolsey, which was formerly the market hall and town hall of Burford. It is a Grade II* listed building.

History

The building
The Tolsey was designed in the Tudor style, built using half-timbering techniques and was completed in 1520. Surveys using dendrology have dated the timbers back to 1525 although the first documented reference to the building was not until 1561. The building was raised on stone pillars so that markets could be held, with an assembly room on the first floor. The design involved a symmetrical main frontage with two bays facing onto the High Street; the first floor was fenestrated by bay windows and surmounted by gables. The ground floor was the place for wool merchants to meet in medieval times. Tolls for the use of the market facilities and taxes were also collected on behalf of the lord of the manor. The assembly room was used as a venue for borough court hearings and also operated as the local town hall.  The room was furnished with a chair, a table and a chest of drawers bearing the coat of arms of Burford Corporation.

A lock-up for petty criminals was established at the rear of the building in the late 16th century, a projecting beam which supported a clock, with a bell suspended below, was installed in the right-hand gable in the 17th century, and a horse drawn fire engine was acquired for the town and stored on the ground floor in the late 18th century. After Burford Corporation was disbanded in 1861, ownership of the building was transferred to trustees. The building fell into a state of disrepair in the first half of the 20th century although it was extensively refurbished in 1955.

The museum
The building was re-opened as a local history museum in 1960 and it was recorded as such in the BBC Domesday Project in 1986. The collection includes items of local history, culture, and industry and exhibits include the town maces, charters and some seals of guilds, a doll's house, and objects related to the brewing, rope-making, and stone quarrying industries.

See also
 List of museums in Oxfordshire
 Grade II* listed buildings in West Oxfordshire
 Museum of Oxford

Notes

References

External links

Government buildings completed in 1520
City and town halls in Oxfordshire
Burford
Grade II* listed buildings in Oxfordshire
Museums established in 1960
Local museums in Oxfordshire
Industry museums in England
Tudor architecture
Former courthouses in England